Đorđije Pavićević (born May 17, 1963) is a Montenegrin professional basketball coach and executive and former player. He currently works as the president for Mornar of the Montenegrin Basketball League and the ABA League.

Coaching career 
Pavićević spent almost an entire coaching career with his hometown team Mornar. He coached Mornar for 1997–98 season in Yugoslav League. Later he joined them in 2003. He was a head coach from 2003 to 2011 and from 2013 to 2017. During a second stint with Mornar, he led the team in the Serbia & Montenegro League in two seasons (2004–05 and 2005–06). Prior to the 2017–18 season, Pavićević left head coach position while his older brother Mihailo Pavićević became the head coach for Mornar.

Executive career 
In 2019, Pavićević became the president of the Mornar Basketball Club.

On 15 July 2019, Pavićević was named a vice-president of the Adriatic Basketball Association.

Personal life 
His brother is Mihailo Pavićević, a basketball coach and current head coach of Mornar.

References

External links 
 Coach Profile at aba-liga.com
 Coach Profile at eurobasket.com

1963 births
Living people
KK Mornar Bar coaches
KK Mornar Bar players
Montenegrin basketball coaches
Montenegrin men's basketball players
People from Bar, Montenegro